Ginkgoites is a genus that refers to extinct plants belonging to Ginkgoaceae. Fossils of these plants have been found around the globe during the Triassic, Jurassic, Cretaceous, with fossils also known from the Paleogene. The name was created as a form genus in 1919 by Albert Seward who stated: "I ... propose to employ the name Ginkgoites for leaves that it is believed belong either to plants generically identical with Ginkgo or to very closely allied types".

References 

Ginkgophyta
Prehistoric gymnosperm genera
Cretaceous plants
Jurassic plants
Triassic plants
Norian first appearances
Campanian genus extinctions
Prehistoric plants of South America
Permian life of South America
Triassic life of South America
Permian Brazil
Triassic Brazil
Flora of Rio Grande do Sul
Fossils of Brazil
Santa Maria Formation
Fossil taxa described in 1919